The following is a list of buildings at Baldwin Wallace University in Berea, Ohio. BW is home to many notable structures and the multi-building BW South Campus Historic District and the BW North Campus Historic District on the National Register of Historic Places.

Campus

The campus is located in Berea, Ohio, a suburb of Cleveland, Ohio. The campus is built around land that originally was two separate schools that combined in 1913. The campus has numerous buildings that carry historical significance. The campus itself has two historic districts on the National Register of Historic Places.

Historic buildings

The Baldwin–Wallace College South Campus Historic District includes a four-block area that is centered on Seminary Street. The south campus of Baldwin–Wallace College incorporates the former German Wallace College campus, which was centered on the mid-19th century site of the Lyceum Village Square. Both the college and the square are listed in the National Register of Historic Places as the Lyceum Village Square and German Wallace College Historic District in 1975. The Baldwin–Wallace College South Campus Historic District includes a total of 14 buildings and one structure.

In 2012, BW moved to propose the preservation of several historic buildings on its north part of campus. The buildings include Baldwin Memorial Library & Carnegie Science Hall (Malicky Center for Social Sciences), Wheeler Hall (Recitation Hall), Wilker Hall, Telfer Hall, Ward Hall, Burrell Observatory, the Alumni House/President’s House, the Tudor House, North Hall, Findley Hall, Lang Hall and Ritter Library.

Academic buildings

Conservatory of Music buildings

The Boesel Musical Arts Center consists of several buildings on the BW campus and houses the BW Conservatory of Music. The Boesel Musical Arts Center opened in 2011. In August 2008, BW acquired the First Congregational United Church of Christ building.  This building was renovated to house conservatory programs and attached to Merner-Pfeiffer Hall/Kulas Hall via a new connecting structure.

Administrative and student life buildings
BW has several administrative buildings that also serve as locations used by students. .

Athletic and recreation buildings

BW has several athletic and recreation facilities used to serve in various sporting events and entertainment events. In 2008, Barack Obama spoke at the Lou Higgins Center during his presidential candidacy.

Notes

External links

 
Baldwin Wallace University
Baldwin Wallace University